St Anne's Church is a Roman Catholic Parish church on Alcester Street in Digbeth, part of the city centre of Birmingham. It was founded by Saint John Henry Newman in 1849. It was moved to a new building in 1884 designed by London architects Albert Vicars and John O'Neill, who also designed St Hugh's Church in Lincoln, and helped design St Peter's Cathedral in Belfast.

The building is Grade II listed.

History

Foundation
In 1847, John Henry Newman came back from Rome to Birmingham after getting permission from Pope Pius IX to create an Oratory of Saint Philip Neri in England. In 1849, he had gathered a group of followers and they initially founded the church in an old gin distillery in Deritend. The area contained poor housing, with many back-to-back rows of houses, intermixed with industry and suffering the social conditions that the country sought to remove decades later. The nature of the housing meant that it was mainly occupied by migrants, in this case workers from Ireland.

In 1852, Newman took his community to Edgbaston in Birmingham when construction of the Birmingham Oratory was completed. St Anne's Church continued, and was administered by the Archdiocese of Birmingham.

Construction
The Irish community continued to increase in Birmingham and Catholic churches were built to accommodate the expanding congregations. St Catherine of Siena Church was built on the Horse Fair in 1874 and St Francis of Assisi church was built in Handsworth in 1894.

In 1859, Fr John P. Dowling became the new parish priest. He provided the land upon which the church stands. In 1884, a new St Anne's church was built on Alcester Street, designed by the London architectural firm Vicars and O'Neill. It was opened by Cardinal Manning. The former distillery that John Henry Newman turned into a church became a school.

J. R. R. Tolkien worshipped at the church when he lived in Moseley and converted to Roman Catholicism in 1900.

Administration
In 1903, Canon Villiers replaced Fr Dowling. When he died on 19 October 1938, the Missionary Oblates of Mary Immaculate (OMI) took over administration of the church. They became involved after their provincial, Fr Michael Ryan OMI, met the Archbishop of Birmingham, Thomas Williams and said that the Oblates were interested in moving into the archdiocese if a parish was available for them to work in. After Canon Villiers died, a vacancy appeared and they served St Anne's Church.

In 2010, the Oblates handed the church back to the Archdiocese of Birmingham who continue to serve the parish.

Parish
In 1952, the first Birmingham St Patrick's Day Parade was held. It goes right through the centre of the parish, along Deritend High Street and up to Digbeth. It happens on the Sunday before 17 March and it is the world's largest St Patrick's Day Parade after New York City and Dublin. The crowds reach as high as 80,000 spectators and there are up to 40 floats, groups and bands in the parade.

The church has a close relationship with the nearby St Anne's Primary School, whose mission statement says that, "At Saint Anne's we look to Jesus as our guide as we pray and learn, so that we can grow as friends together. Each one of us is special and we accept and respect one another as children of God.'

The church has three Sunday Masses every week. There is a Vigil Mass at 1:00 pm on Saturday, and Masses at 11:00 am and 6:30 pm on Sunday.

List of parish priests
The priests in charge of the parish were:

See also
 St Catherine of Siena Church, Birmingham
 St Francis of Assisi Church, Handsworth
 Birmingham Oratory
 John Henry Newman
 Missionary Oblates of Mary Immaculate

References

External links
 St Anne's Church website
 St Anne's Diocesan website

Saint Anne
J. R. R. Tolkien
1849 establishments in England
Gothic Revival architecture in the West Midlands (county)
Roman Catholic churches completed in 1884
Gothic Revival church buildings in England
19th-century Roman Catholic church buildings in the United Kingdom
Grade II listed churches in Birmingham